Ewell East is a railway station in Ewell, Surrey. It has two platforms, one for services to Sutton, West Croydon and London, the other for services to Epsom. The ticket office and main entrance is on the London-bound side, accessed from Cheam Road. On the Epsom-bound side, there is an additional entrance from a footpath linking the Cheam Road with Reigate Road  near the North East Surrey College of Technology.

It was opened on 10 May 1847 with the Croydon and Epsom Railway. This was subsumed into the London, Brighton and South Coast Railway. Train service is now provided by Southern.

Ewell East has been part of Travelcard Zone 6 since January 2008.

Services 
All services at Ewell East are operated by Southern using  EMUs.

The typical off-peak service in trains per hour is:
 1 tph to  via 
 2 tph to  via 
 2 tph to 
 1 tph to  via 

On Saturday evenings (after approximately 18:45) and on Sundays, there is no service south of Dorking to Horsham.

Gallery

See also
Ewell West railway station

References

External links

Transport in Epsom and Ewell
Railway stations in Surrey
Former London, Brighton and South Coast Railway stations
Railway stations in Great Britain opened in 1847
Railway stations served by Govia Thameslink Railway
1847 establishments in England